Cathy & David Guetta is a husband and wife duo sometimes releasing music jointly. Refer to:

Cathy Guetta
David Guetta